Portia Sullivan Reiners (born March 8, 1990) is an American actress. She has worked in theater, television, and film. Her television career includes the role of Britney Jennings on One Life to Live.

Career
Reiners began her acting career in theater at age seven, appearing as Oliver in the musical Oliver, and then was signed to the Abrams Artists Agency at age ten. She began her television career in 2000 with the role of Lily Benton Montgomery in All My Children, then had the role of Ada Dunne in As the World Turns in 2006. She then had the role of Britney Jennings on One Life to Live from 2006 through 2007.

She also continued in theater, with roles including Annie in the musical Annie, Catherine in The Children's Hour, Baby June in the musical Gypsy, and the starring role of Jenny Litnov in The Notebook at the McGinn-Cazale Theatre in New York City. In 2001, she played the role of Kasia Gruszka in the play More Lies about Jerzy at the Vineyard Theatre in New York City.

She starred as Mel in the 2010 movie Twelve Thirty.

Filmography
 All My Children (7 episodes, 2000-2006) .... Lily Benton Montgomery
 The Grey Zone (2001) .... Young Girl (voice)
 Iron Jawed Angels (2004) (TV movie) .... 14-year-old Jenny Leighton
 Law & Order: Criminal Intent (1 episode, "In the Wee Small Hours: Part 1", 2005) .... Nancy
 Law & Order (1 episode, "Great Satan", 2009) ....Jill Sorenson
 As the World Turns (13 episodes, 2006) .... Ada Dunne
 One Life to Live (47 episodes, 2006-2007) .... Britney Jennings
 Neal Cassady (2007) .... Cathy Cassady
 Twelve Thirty (2010)

Personal life
Her mother was an actress. Reiners was named after the character Portia from Shakespeare's The Merchant of Venice.

References

External links
 
 Portia Reiners at Twitter

1990 births
Living people
American soap opera actresses
Place of birth missing (living people)
21st-century American women